The Partido por la Victoria del Pueblo, also known as the Party for the Victory of the People, or People's Victory Party (PVP), is a political organization in Uruguay. Its military wing is known as OPR-33. The leftist group began under an anarcho-syndicalist philosophy and was overshadowed by Tupamaros in Uruguay. The Party grew in strength among exiles in Argentina, both in followers and money, with $10 million from the successful ransom for a kidnapped businessman. Their planned guerrilla operation to reclaim their place in Uruguay went awry with the surprise 1976 Argentine coup d'état. Several days after the coup, three PVP members were arrested while attempting to cross back into Uruguay. Dozens of other group members were arrested in Argentina, including its leaders, in concert with Uruguayan security forces.

See also
 Hugo Cores
 Operation Condor

References

Further reading

External links

1975 establishments in Uruguay
Anti-capitalist political parties
Broad Front (Uruguay)
Marxist parties
Political parties established in 1975
Political parties in Uruguay
Political party factions in Uruguay
Socialist parties in Uruguay